In archaeology, a bone tool is a tool created from bone. A bone tool can conceivably be created from almost any bone, and in a variety of methods.

Bone tools have been documented from the advent of Homo sapiens and are also known from Homo neanderthalensis contexts or even earlier. Bone has been used for making tools by virtually all hunter-gatherer societies, even when other materials were readily available. Any part of the skeleton can potentially be utilized; however, antlers and long bones provide some of the best working material. Long bone fragments can be shaped, by scraping against an abrasive stone, into such items as arrow and spear points, needles, awls, and fish hooks.

Bone tools had mainly been made from bone splinters or were cut into a useful shape. Archaeologists are convinced that bone tools were purposefully made by deer antlers cut into shape.
 
The bone was fashioned into tools such as spoons, knives, awls, pins, fish hooks, needles, flakers, hide scrapers and reamers. They made musical rasps, flutes and whistles as well as toys of bone. Decoratively carved articles were also made of bone such as hair combs, hair pins and pendants. Antler is much harder than bone and was used for flakers, points, knives and hair combs. Even the teeth and hooves did not go to waste. The teeth were drilled and used for decoration on clothing and necklaces. The hooves were also drilled and used for decoration on clothing as well as strung for rattles and bells.
 
As an organic material, bone often does not survive in a way that is archaeologically recoverable. However, under the right conditions, bone tools do sometimes survive and many have been recovered from locations around the world representing time periods throughout history and prehistory. Also many examples have been collected ethnographically, and some traditional peoples, as well as experimental archaeologists, continue to use bone to make tools.

History
The oldest excavated bone tools are from Africa, dated to about 1.5 million years ago. It is widely accepted that they appeared and developed in Africa before any other geographic region. A very famous excavation of bone tools is that of the Blombos Cave in South Africa. A collection of twenty-eight bone tools were recovered from 70 thousand year old Middle Stone Age levels at Blombos Cave. Careful analyses of these tools reveal that formal production methods were used to create awls and projectile points.

Bone tools have been discovered in the context of Neanderthal groups as well as throughout the development of anatomically modern humans. Archaeologists have long believed that Neanderthals learned how to make bone tools from modern humans and by mimicking stone tools, viewing bone as simply another raw material. Modern humans, on the other hand, took advantage of the properties of bone and worked them into specific shapes and tools.

A recent discovery of specialized bone tools at two Neanderthal sites in southwestern France brings to light the idea that Neanderthals may have actually taught modern humans how to make specialized bone tools. The uncovering of lissoirs ("polishing stones") at these sites is significant as they are about 51,000 years old, predating the known arrival of modern humans to Europe.

Prior to the Industrial Revolution (when machine mass production of sharp tools became viable), many everyday tools such as needles were made from bone; such items continue to be valued today as antiques.
Bone folders are still used by bookbinders.

Types

Awls
An awl is as a long, pointed spike generally used for piercing or marking materials such as wood or leather. Bone awls are pointed tips made on any bone splinter. Bone awls vary considerably in the amount of polish from wear, the method of preparation, and size. Bone awls tend to be classified according to the characteristics of the bone used to make the awl. Many bone awls retain an epiphysis, or rounded end of a bone. Although authors have differing theories as to the uses of bone awls, the two main uses agreed upon are as manipulators in the making of basketry and as perforators in the working of hide.

Spear points and bipoints
Bone spear points and bipoints have been found throughout the world. A mastodon rib bone found in Washington State was discovered in the 1970s with a broken bone projectile point stuck in it. A 2011 study using radiocarbon dating found that it is about 14,000 years old. This discovery is significant because it predates the arrival of the Clovis people, and may help rewrite human history in the Americas.

Hoes
Hoes fashioned from bison scapula were common cultivating tools among the Plains Village Indians. In particular, it was used for cultivating small garden crops. It continued to be used among these Indians until iron hoes were brought by French traders in the 18th century. Recovered bone hoes range from 40 cm to as small as 15 cm. The size variation is due, in large part, to frequent resharpening. Bone tools were also used for digging up insect mounds for consumption, known as Entomophagy.

Musical instruments
A number of different musical instruments have been created from bone. A vulture-bone flute discovered in Europe is currently considered the world's oldest musical instrument. At about 40,000 years old, the instrument dates to the time that modern humans were settling in the area. Researchers argue that musical instruments such as this flute helped modern humans form tighter social bonds, giving them an advantage over their Neanderthal counterparts.

In addition, bones consist of a pair of animal bones that are played by clacking the bones together. As a musical instrument, they have a history that dates to ancient China, Egypt and Greece.

Other types

 Harpoons and fishhooks
 Sickles
 Knives
 Daggers
 Pin-like tools
 Smoothers
 Quill flatteners
 Arrow-shaft wrenches
 Fleshers
 Hide grainers
 Beads
 Needles
 Bow and Arrow
 Snares

See also
 Blombos Cave
 Paleolithic tally sticks
 Bone folder

References

Further reading
 
 Baffier, D. & Julien, M. (1990). "L'outillage en os des niveaux châtelperroniens d'Arcy-sur-Cure (Yonne)", in: Paléolithique moyen récent et Paléolithique supérieur ancien en Europe, Colloque international de Nemours (9-11 mai 1988), Mémoires du Musée de Préhistoire d'Ile-de-France, 3, 329-334.
 
 
 

Archaeological artefact types
Tools